The busiest airports by continent is based on the busiest airports in all continents except Antarctica and Oceania.

Busiest airports in Europe, 2020

Busiest airports in Asia, 2018

Busiest airports in North America, 2020

Busiest airports in South America, 2020

Busiest airports in Africa, 2018

Busiest airports in the world, 2018

See also

Continents
 List of the busiest airports in Africa
 List of the busiest airports in Asia
 List of the busiest airports in Australia
 List of the busiest airports in Europe
 List of the busiest airports in North America
 List of the busiest airports in Oceania 
 List of the busiest airports in South America

Regions
 List of the busiest airports in the Baltic states
 List of the busiest airports in the Caribbean
 List of the busiest airports in Central America
 List of the busiest airports in the former USSR
 List of the busiest airports in Latin America
 List of the busiest airports in the Nordic countries

Rankings
 List of busiest airports by aircraft movements
 List of busiest airports by cargo traffic
 List of busiest airports by international passenger traffic
 List of busiest airports by passenger traffic

References

 Continent